The Meggitt Vindicator II is a Canadian-built unmanned aerial vehicle – training target formerly used by the Canadian Forces and United States Navy. It was used to simulate various types of targets like missiles and aircraft, including helicopters. The vehicle was not powered, but was launched via pneumatic catapult.

Operators

 Canadian Forces - as CU-162

 United States Navy

On display

 1 UAV-T donated to Canadian War Museum in 2010
 1 UAV-T at Naval Museum of Alberta
 1 Reynolds-Alberta Museum

Specifications (Vindicator II)

References

Vindicator II
Target drones